is a city located in Mie Prefecture, Japan. , the city had an estimated population of 43,114 in 17314 households and a population density of 200 persons per km².

Geography
Inabe is located in the far northeastern tip of the Kii Peninsula, and the far northwestern corner of Mie Prefecture, along the border with Gifu and Shiga prefectures. The Inabe River flows through the city center.

Neighboring municipalities
Mie Prefecture
Yokkaichi
Kuwana
Tōin
Komono
Gifu Prefecture
Ōgaki
Kaizu
Yōrō
Shiga Prefecture
Higashiōmi
Taga

Climate
Inabe has a Humid subtropical climate (Köppen Cfa) characterized by warm summers and cool winters with light to no snowfall.  The average annual temperature in Inabe is 13.0 °C. The average annual rainfall is 1960 mm with September as the wettest month.

Demographics
Per Japanese census data, the population of Inabe has remained relatively steady over the past 30 years.

History
The area of modern Inabe was part of ancient Ise Province was mostly under the control of Kuwana Domain in then Edo period. With the creation of the modern municipalities system on April 1, 1889, the village of Ageki was established within Inabe District, Mie. Ageki was raised to town status on March 10, 1929 and merged with the neighboring villages of Toyashiro and Yamasato on April 1, 1955 to form the town of Hokusei. The city of Inabe was established on December 1, 2003, from the merger of the former town of Hokusei with neighboring Inabe, Daian, and Fujiwara.

Government
Inabe has a mayor-council form of government with a directly elected mayor and a unicameral city council of 18 members. Inabe, together with the town of Tōin, contributes two members to the Mie Prefectural Assembly. In terms of national politics, the city is part of Mie 3rd district of the lower house of the Diet of Japan.

Economy
Inabe is a regional commercial center and has a mixed industrial and agricultural economy. Toyota Motor, Denso and other automobile-related industries form a strong component of the local economy.

Education
Inabe has 11 public elementary schools and four public middle schools operated by the city government and one public high school operated by the Mie Prefectural Department of Education.

Transportation

Railway
 Sangi Railway – Sangi Line
  –  -  –  –  -  –  – 
 Sangi Railway –  Hokusei Line
  –  -  –

Highway

Local attractions
Freight Railway Museum

Notable people
Kiyoshi Itô, mathematician
Tatsuma Itō, tennis player
Yūji Nishida,volleyball player

References

External links

 
 Inabe City official website 

Cities in Mie Prefecture
Inabe, Mie